The 2018–19 Russian Cup, also known as the Olimp Russian Cup was the 27th season of the Russian football knockout tournament since the dissolution of Soviet Union. The Russian Cup is organized by the Russian Football Union.

The competition started on 21 July 2018 and concluded on 22 May 2019.

First round

Second round 
West and Center

Third round

Fourth round

Round of 32 
The round of 32 was played from 25 September 2018 to 10 October 2018.

Round of 16
The round of 16 was played from 25 October 2018 to 1 November 2018.

Quarter-finals
The first legs were played on 28 November 2018 and 6 December 2018. The second legs were played on 24 February 2019.

|}

First leg

Second leg

Semi-finals
The first legs were played on 3 April 2019. The second legs were played on 15 May 2019.

|}

First leg

Second leg

Final
The final match was played on 22 May 2019.

References

External links
 Official page 

Russian Cup seasons
Cup
Russian Cup